Mohamed Jasem Ben Haji (born 28 December 1970) is a Kuwaiti footballer. He competed in the men's tournament at the 1992 Summer Olympics.

References

External links
 

1970 births
Living people
Kuwaiti footballers
Kuwait international footballers
Olympic footballers of Kuwait
Footballers at the 1992 Summer Olympics
Place of birth missing (living people)
Association football midfielders
Asian Games medalists in football
Footballers at the 1998 Asian Games
Asian Games silver medalists for Kuwait
Medalists at the 1998 Asian Games
Kuwait Premier League players